Arthur Quentin de Gromard (1821–1896) was a French musician.

Gromard lived in Eu, Seine-Maritime, founded a philharmonic society (the Cécilienne) in 1857, and he was the inventor of a musical instrument, called the cecilium (1861). He spent 35 years on the design of this complex instrument, a cross between a harmonium and a cello. It is related to the concertina, bandoneon and the accordion. Only 310 originals were ever created. This instrument is on display in museums in Brussels, Milan and New York, the Schweizerisches Harmonium-Museum, Liestal and Ringve Museum, Trondheim, Norway. The instrument uses free reeds and, according to its inventor, could be used as a solo instrument, to provide accompaniment, or as a quartet. However, "its sound was not powerful enough to meet the demands of a regular orchestral instrument."

It was described in the Crosby Brown Collection:

See also

Mélophone

References

External links 
Information in French 
"photo of a cecilium", Flickr.com.
"photo", Concertina.net.

1821 births
1896 deaths
French musicians
Inventors of musical instruments